South Charleston is the name of the following places in the United States of America:

South Charleston, Ohio, a village
South Charleston, West Virginia, a city

See also
South Charleston High School, Charleston, South Carolina